Pedro Pacheco de Villena (29 June 14885 March 1560), also known as Pedro Pacheco Ladrón de Guevara, was a Spanish cardinal and viceroy of Naples. In Italian his name is spelled Pietro Pacecco. His nephew Francisco Pacheco de Toledo was also a cardinal.

Biography
Pedro Pacheco de Villena was the son of Alfonso Tellez Giron, son of Martin Vazquez de Acuña and Maria Teresa Giron, heiress of her House.  His uncle was Marques de Villena. He studied at Salamanca. He was a chamberlain of Pope Alexander VI and followed him to Rome in 1522. He worked in several offices for the Roman Curia, notably as referendary at the Supreme Tribunal of the Apostolic Signatura. He was Dean of Santiago Cathedral and Archdeacon of Valpuesta. Charles V made him visitor to the chancellery of Valladolid and of Granada.

He was appointed bishop of Mondoñedo (Mindionensis) in Galicia and was confirmed by Pope Paul III (Farnese) on 6 September, 1532, and was later translated to the diocese of Ciudad Rodrigo, with the consent of Pope Paul given in Consistory on 11 April, 1537.

He was named Bishop of Pamplona by the Emperor, an appointment confirmed by Pope Paul III in consistory on 21 May, 1539.  Pacheco took possession of his diocese by proxy of Dr. Martinez y Gaspar Lizano on 10 July, 1539.  He finally appeared personally to be enthroned on 14 March, 1540. He carried out a visitation of the cathedral chapter of Pamplona.  After a year of opposition and obfuscation, an agreement between the bishop and canons was reached on 14 April, 1541, for the enforcement of the regulation of the canons.  In August 1544, the bishop convoked a synod for his diocese, the thirteenth in the diocese's history. He established the custom of holding annual processions on Corpus Christi and its Octave, Easter day, the Feast of S. Augustine and the Feast of S. Francis.  At the conclusion of the synod, the Emperor summoned Pacheco to service at Court.

The Emperor appointed him Bishop of Jaén, but not for the benefit of the people of that diocese.  The Emperor wanted Bishop Pacheco as his agent at the Papal Court.  The new diocese gave Pacheco the status and the financial resources to carry out his mission in Rome. Jaen would be ruled by a governor and provisor in the name of the bishop. The bishop turned over the administration of his diocese to a vicar, Gabriel de Guevara, on 3 January, 1545.

Later, on 30 April, 1554, he became Bishop of Sigüenza (Segontia), a post he held until his death in 1560.

He also took part in the council of Trent and was the first to address the issue of the Immaculate Conception of the Virgin Mary.

Bishop Pedro Pacheco de Villena was made a cardinal by Pope Paul III at the consistory of 16 December 1545.

He took part in the 1549–50 conclave which elected Cardinal Giovanni Maria Ciocchi del Monte as Pope Julius III.

In 1553 Cardinal Pacheco was made viceroy of Naples by Charles V.  He served from 1553 to 1555, until the election of Pope Paul IV (Carafa).

He did not take part in the first conclave of 1555 which elected Cardinal Marcello Cervini as pope Marcellus II. He was present, however,  at the second conclave of 1555 which elected Gian Pietro Carafa of Naples as pope Paul IV,

On 20 September, 1557, he opted for the Order of Cardinal Bishops and was promoted to the See of Albano, which had become vacant with the promotion of Cardinal Francesco Pisano to the See of Tusculum.  It is said that Pope Paul IV granted his request while passing over that of Cardinal Georges d'Armagnac, who was senior to Cardinal Pacheco by a year.  Unfortunately, during his administration of the diocese, the territory of Albano was devastated by armies for two years running during the war between Pope Paul IV (who had once been Bishop of Albano) and the Spanish Imperial forces under the command of Fernando of Toledo, Duque de Alba.

He took part in the conclave of 1559 which elected Cardinal Giovanni Angelo de' Medici as pope Pius IV.
In the same year he was  made one of the six Cardinal Inquisitors of the tribunal of the Universal and Roman Inquisition in Rome by Pius IV.

He died in his palazzo in Rome, suddenly (subito ex accidenti), on 5 March, 1560.  He was buried in the Church of S. Maria in Aracoeli on 13 March, 1560.  His body was later transferred to the Puebla de Montalban, where it was interred in the Convent of the Franciscans (S. Chiara), which he had founded.

References

Sources
 Angel Martín González,  El cardenal don Pedro Pacheco, obispo de Jaén, en el Concilio de Trento : (un prelado que personificó la política imperial de Carlos V) (Jaén : Instituto de Estudios Giennenses, Excma. Diputación Provincial, 1974).

1488 births
1560 deaths
16th-century Spanish cardinals
Bishops of Jaén
Bishops of Sigüenza
Bishops of Pamplona
Viceroys of Naples
University of Salamanca alumni
Academic staff of the University of Salamanca